Besieged may refer to:

 the state of being under siege
 Besieged (film),  a 1998 film by Bernardo Bertolucci